The 2014 season is the 104th season of competitive football in Paraguay.

Primera División

Transfers

 List of transfers during the 2014 season registered under the Asociación Paraguaya de Fútbol.

National team

References
 Paraguay: Fixtures and Results

External links
 Diario ABC Color
 Asociación Paraguaya de Fútbol

 
Seasons in Paraguayan football